James Paul Lister (born 6 April 1976) is an Australian politician. He has been the Liberal National Party member for Southern Downs in the Queensland Legislative Assembly since 2017.

Lister was born in Benowa, Queensland, and holds a Bachelor of Applied Science from the Queensland University of Technology. He served in the Royal Australian Air Force from 2000 to 2017, during which time he was aide-de-camp to Michael Jeffrey, 24th Governor-General of Australia, in 2004 and Dame Quentin Bryce, 24th Governor of Queensland, from 2007 to 2008.

References

External links
Parliamentary Profile

1976 births
Living people
Members of the Queensland Legislative Assembly
Liberal National Party of Queensland politicians
Queensland University of Technology alumni
Royal Australian Air Force officers
21st-century Australian politicians